Batsaikhany Dölgöön (born 26 October 1986) is a Mongolian Olympic swimmer. He represented his country at the 2016 Summer Olympics.

References

External links
 

1986 births
Living people
Mongolian male swimmers
Swimmers at the 2016 Summer Olympics
Olympic swimmers of Mongolia
Swimmers at the 2010 Asian Games
Swimmers at the 2014 Asian Games
Asian Games competitors for Mongolia
21st-century Mongolian people